Shompen hut is a village in the Nicobar district of Andaman and Nicobar Islands, India. It is located in the Great Nicobar tehsil.

History 

The Shompen Hut complex was built by the Government of India in 1984, at the 27th km point on the East-West road connecting Campbell Bay to Kopen Heat (Copenheat) Nicobarese village. The objective was to provide health, education and other services to the Shompen people. However, members of the Shompen tribe did not visit the complex frequently. A horticultural garden was also developed at the site.

Demographics 

According to the 2011 census of India, Shompen hut has 14 households. The effective literacy rate (i.e. the literacy rate of population excluding children aged 6 and below) is 0%.

References 

Villages in Great Nicobar tehsil